Abner Mares Martínez (born November 28, 1985) is a Mexican-American professional boxer who also works as a boxing analyst and commentator for Showtime. He has held multiple world championships in three weight classes, including the IBF bantamweight title from 2011 to 2012, the WBC super bantamweight title from 2012 to 2013, the WBC featherweight title in 2013, and the WBA (Regular) featherweight title from 2016 to 2018. As an amateur boxer, Mares won numerous medals at international tournaments while representing Mexico. He grew up in the city of Hawaiian Gardens, California and holds dual citizenship with Mexico and the United States.

Early life 
Mares was born in Guadalajara, Jalisco, Mexico and at age seven his family moved to the city of Hawaiian Gardens, California. At age fifteen he was sent back to Mexico by his father.

Amateur career 
As an amateur, Mares compiled a record of 112-8 with 84 KOs. Mares won the U17 World Championships and the bantamweight gold medal at the Central American games 2002 beating Juan Manuel López and the silver medal in the same division in 2003 at the Pan American Games in Santo Domingo.
At the Junior World Championships 2004, he finished second losing to Aibek Abdimomunov.
He participated in the 2004 Summer Olympics for his native country. There he was beaten in the first round of the Bantamweight (54 kg) division by Hungary's Zsolt Bedák in a highly controversial decision.

Amateur highlights 
Represented Mexico at the 2004 Olympics in Athens as a Bantamweight, losing in the opening round to Zsolt Bedak of Hungary on points 27-24
Silver medalist at the 2004 World Junior Championships
Silver medalist at the 2003 Pan American Games, losing to Guillermo Rigondeaux, with a score of 17 - 7.
Gold medalist at the 2002 Central American & Caribbean Games
Gold medalist at the 2002 World Cadet Championships

Professional career 
In January 2005, Mares won his professional debut against Puerto Rican Luis Malave.

Bantamweight 
On September 7, 2007, he won the WBO NABA Bantamweight Championship by defeating former WBO Champion Isidro García. Mares won his next three bouts before suffering an eye injury which required him to undergo surgery. He returned to the ring 10 months later by stopping Jonathan Perez. He had been trained as a professional by Hall of Famer Ignacio Beristáin, however, the two split after Mares changed promotional companies.

Mares vs. Perez 
On May 22, 2010, Mares challenged undefeated IBF Bantamweight Champion and the No. 4 ranked Bantamweight Yonnhy Perez (20-0) for his title. The bout ended in a 12-round majority draw with one judge scoring it 115-113 in favor of Mares while the other two scored it 114-114 even. The majority of the press at ringside scored the bout in favor of Mares.

This marked the launch and the climb to success with world-famous trainer, Clemente Medina.

Bantamweight Tournament

Mares vs. Darchinyan 
Golden Boy Promotions announced that Mares would be taking part in Showtime's four-man single elimination bantamweight tournament, which would also include Vic Darchinyan, Joseph Agbeko and Yonnhy Perez.
In the first round of the tournament, Mares faced IBO Bantamweight Champion Vic Darchinyan and defeated him by a highly controversial 12 round split decision to claim the IBO Championship title and WBC Silver title.

Mares vs. Agbeko I 

Mares was scheduled to face IBF Champion and No. 3 ranked Joseph Agbeko in the final round of the tournament on April 23, 2011. However, Agbeko pulled out of the fight just days prior citing an injury. The match was rescheduled for August 13, 2011. Mares fought Agbeko on August 13 on Showtime and won the title and the tournament by majority decision. However, the match was not without controversy, as Mares delivered numerous low blows during the match, with referee Russell Mora not penalizing him with point deductions for any of the blows throughout the match. The most infamous of these blows came during the 11th round of the fight, in which a low blow from Mares landed on Agbeko's cup, causing Agbeko to drop. While the low blow was clearly visible to everyone, referee Mora ruled it as a knockdown.

Mares vs. Agbeko II 
On December 3, 2011, Mares and Agbeko fought a rematch due to their controversial first fight. While the second fight proved to be much less controversial, there were still several low blow warnings from the referee to Mares. Though Agbeko had moments in the fight where he outboxed Mares from the outside, Mares closed the distance and outworked Agbeko throughout the fight, and landed the more significant punches. Mares was awarded a unanimous decision win, by the scores of 118-110 from all three judges. .

Super Bantamweight

Super Bantamweight title 
In Mares' next fight, he moved up to the super bantamweight division, fighting former world champion Eric Morel for the vacant WBC Super Bantamweight title. The fight took place on April 21, 2012, at a catchweight of 120 lbs. Mares effectively out worked, landed more, and landed the harder punches throughout the fight, with Morel showing significant signs of his age. Mares won a unanimous decision by the scores of 120-107, 119-109, and 119-109 to claim his first Super Bantamweight title.

Mares vs. Moreno 
Mares' next fight took place on November 10, 2012, against the world No. 1 ranked bantamweight and then No.10 pound-for-pound Anselmo Moreno. Mares started the fight off fast, applying relentless pressure on Moreno, forcing Moreno to the ropes for the majority of the early rounds. Moreno still had his moments while the two were in the middle of the ring, landing clean shots, while Mares attempted to out work Moreno and attack his body while on the ropes. In the 5th round, Moreno was having success staying off the ropes when he could, and out boxing Mares in the center of the ring. Near the end of the round, Mares trapped Moreno on the ropes and landed a hard straight right hand, which ultimately sent Moreno to the canvas for the first time in his career. The following middle rounds of the fight, Mares seemed in control working the body and landing his hard overhand right, relentless pressuring Moreno for the majority of the rounds. In the 11th round, Moreno was docked a point for pushing Mares' head down while Mares rushed him on the ropes. This was seen as very controversial, given that Mares and Moreno both had been warned several times throughout the fight and only Moreno was docked a point. After the point deduction, Moreno effectively out pointed Mares in the middle of the ring during the final rounds and even successfully traded with Mares against the ropes, while Mares seemed to tire the final couple rounds.

Mares was awarded the Unanimous decision by the scores of 116-110, 116-110, and 120-106.

Featherweight

Mares vs. De Leon
Mares moved up to 126 lbs to fight WBC Featherweight champion and Ring No. 2 ranked Featherweight, Daniel Ponce de León in the Mayweather-Guerrero undercard on May 4, 2013, and knocked down de León in the second and ninth rounds en route to handing him a TKO loss at 2:20 of the ninth round, winning the WBC featherweight title in the process.

Mares vs. González 
Mares defended his WBC Featherweight title against underdog former world champion Jhonny González on August 24, 2013, at the StubHub Center in Carson, California.  Mares lost the fight in a first-round TKO to González. The referee stopped the fight after Mares was knocked down for the second time in the first round.

Mares would leave his management company, Espinoza Boxing Club, as well as trainer Clemente Medina. He would train with Virgil Hunter for his next fight before returning to Clemente Medina.

Mares vs Cuellar 
On December 10, 2016, Mares fought Jesus Cuellar for the WBA "regular" featherweight title. Mares won tia fight via split-decision, with two of the judges scoring the fight in his favor, 117-110 and 116-111 while the third judge saw Cuellar as the winner, scoring it 115-112 in favor of the Argentine.

Mares vs Gutierrez 
In his next fight, Mares fought Andres Gutierrez. Mares retained his title be winning the fight via technical decision in the tenth round.

Mares vs Santa Cruz 
On June 9, 2018, Mares fought WBA super featherweight champion Leo Santa Cruz in a long-anticipated rematch. In a brutal and exciting fight, both fighters were throwing and connecting at a similar rate. All three judges agreed on who is the winner of the fight, with all three scoring it in favor Santa Cruz, 117-111, 116-112 and 115-113.

Professional boxing record

See also
List of Mexican boxing world champions

References

Video references

External links 

2002 cadets
Juniors 2004
Abner Mares - Profile, News Archive & Current Rankings at Box.Live

1985 births
Living people
Mexican male boxers
Boxers from Jalisco
World bantamweight boxing champions
World super-bantamweight boxing champions
World featherweight boxing champions
Boxers at the 2003 Pan American Games
Boxers at the 2004 Summer Olympics
Olympic boxers of Mexico
Sportspeople from Guadalajara, Jalisco
Pan American Games silver medalists for Mexico
World Boxing Council champions
International Boxing Federation champions
World Boxing Association champions
Pan American Games medalists in boxing
Central American and Caribbean Games gold medalists for Mexico
Competitors at the 2002 Central American and Caribbean Games
Central American and Caribbean Games medalists in boxing
Medalists at the 2003 Pan American Games